David Lloyd Meredith (30 October 1933 – 22 October 2008) was an English actor.  He came from a Welsh family background, but was born in London.

His best known role was as uniform Sergeant, then Detective Sergeant (finally Detective Inspector) Bob Evans in Softly, Softly: Taskforce for its entire run from 1969 to 1976. He also played small roles in films such as That Summer!, Henry V and The Englishman Who Went Up a Hill But Came Down a Mountain.

He also trained and worked as an osteopath.

Filmography

References

External links

Obituary in The Guardian

Male actors from London
English male television actors
People educated at Ealing County Grammar School for Boys
1933 births
2008 deaths
Osteopaths